Cameroon's Reunification Monument was constructed in the 1970s to memorialize the post-colonial merging of British and French Cameroon. Located in Yaounde, its architects are Gedeon Mpondo and Engelbert Mveng. 

Another reunification monument, albeit far less well-known, is located in Mamfe.

References

Buildings and structures in Yaoundé
Monuments and memorials in Cameroon